"Believe" is Misia's 3rd single. It was released on April 21, 1999. It peaked at #2 selling 95,930 copies on its first week. The song was used in Hitachi's "Maxell MD" commercial. "Believe" is one of MISIA's signature songs.

Track list

Charts
8 cm Single

12 cm Single

External links
https://web.archive.org/web/20061117164950/http://www.rhythmedia.co.jp/misia/disc/ — MISIA DISCOGRAPHY

1999 singles
Misia songs
Songs written by Misia
Song recordings produced by Jun Sasaki
1999 songs